Pakistan is a member of the South Asian Zone of the Olympic Council of Asia (OCA), has participated in the Asian Games since their second edition in 1954. The Pakistan Olympic Association, established in 1948, and recognised in the same year by the International Olympic Committee, is the National Olympic Committee for Pakistan.

Pakistan was one of the first five founding members of the Asian Games Federation on 13 February 1949, in New Delhi, the organisation which was disbanded on 26 November 1981, and replaced by the Olympic Council of Asia.

Membership of Olympic Council of Asia
Pakistan is a member of the South Asian Zone of the Olympic Council of Asia, the governing body of all the sports in Asia, recognised by the International Olympic Committee as the continental association of Asia. Being a member of South Asian Zone, Pakistan also participates in the South Asian Games, sub-regional Games for South Asia.

The OCA organises five major continental-level multi-sport events: the Asian Summer Games (which are commonly known as the Asian Games), Asian Winter Games, Asian Indoor-Martial Arts Games, Asian Beach Games, and Asian Youth Games. Before 2009, Indoor and Martial Arts were two separate events, specialised for indoor and martial arts sports respectively.  However, the OCA has since amalgamated them into a single event, Asian Indoor-Martial Arts Games, which will be debuted in 2013 in Incheon, South Korea. As a member of OCA, Pakistan is privileged to participate in all these multi-sport events.

Summer Games results

Asian Games Medals by sport

Winter Games results

Pakistan has never won a medal in the Asian Winter Games.

Para Games results

Pakistan competed in the inaugural Asian Para Games in Guangzhou in 2010 and finished at 13th spot with four medals.
{| class="wikitable sortable" style="margin-top:0; text-align:center;"
|-
!Games
!style="width:4em;"|Rank
|style="background:gold; width:4em;"|Gold
|style="background:silver; width:4em;"|Silver
| style="background:#c96; width:4em;"|Bronze
!style="width:4em;"|Total
|-
|align=left| 2010 Guangzhou || 13 || 2 || 1 || 1 || 4
|-
|align=left| 2014 Incheon || 32 || 0 || 0 || 1 || 1
|-
|align=left| 2018 Jakarta || 20 || 2 || 0 || 1 || 3
|-
|align=left| 2022 Hangzhou || colspan=5| Future event|-
! Total !! 20 !! 4 !! 1 !! 3 !! 8
|}

Indoor Games results

Pakistan has sent athletes in all the revisions of the Asian Indoor Games except the 2009 Games in Hanoi. Pakistan has never won a gold medal in these Games. In the 2005 Asian Indoor Games, held in Bangkok, Thailand from 12 to 19 November 2005, only one Pakistani athlete, Abdul Rashid, succeeded in winning a medal, a silver in the 60 m sprint. Pakistan won several medals in the 2007 Macau Games, held from 26 October to 3 November 2007; a silver was won by the Pakistan national kabaddi team and Muhammad Sajjad earned a bronze in the 60 m hurdles. Pakistan didn't compete in the 2009 games.

Beach Games results

Pakistan has sent its delegation to both editions of the Asian Beach Games—a biennial multi-sport event which features sporting events played on a seaside beach. In the 2008 Asian Beach Games, held in Bali, Indonesia, from 18 to 26 October 2008, Pakistani athletes won a total of seven medals, with two gold. In the 2010 Asian Beach Games, organised in Muscat, Oman from 8 to 16 December, Pakistan won a total of six medals, but no gold, and finished at the 15th spot in the medal table.

Martial Arts Games results

Pakistan participated in the First Asian Martial Arts Games held in Bangkok, Thailand, from 1 to 9 August 2009. Pakistan won a total of nine medals in the Games, including three gold, two silver and four bronze.

Youth Games results

Pakistan participated in the First Asian Youth Games held in Singapore from 29 June to 7 July 2009. The delegation from Pakistan consisted of 12 officials and 27 competitors (five women and twenty-two men). Pakistani athletes competed in sailing, athletics, swimming and table tennis. Raheem Khan won a bronze in the javelin throw event of athletics. Khan was the only medalist from the Pakistani side. None of the remaining athletes advanced past the qualifying stages, and thus did not win any medals. Pakistan ranked 21st and finished last in the medal table of the Games, a position shared with four other Asian National Olympic Committees. Pakistan didn't win any medal in 2013 games.

Indoor and Martial Arts Games results

Asian Indoor Games and Martial Games were combined into one event and called Asian Indoor and Martial Arts Games. The first edition of these games was held in Incheon in 2013. Pakistan sent 8 athletes to the event but couldn't win any medal.
In 2017, Pakistan sent 107 athletes to Ashgabat(2017) and won 21 medals including 2 gold, 3 silver and 16 bronze.

South Asian Games resultsA red box around the year indicates the games were played within PakistanOriginal Article'' : Pakistan at the South Asian Games

Being a part of South Asian region, Pakistan takes part in the South Asian Games, which were previously known as SAF Games. 11 editions of these games have taken place so far. Pakistan finished at second place in seven of these. It finished third three times and on one occasion, it ended up in fourth place. Pakistan's biggest haul came in 2006 games in Colombo when it won 158 medals including 43 golds. Eight nations including India, Pakistan, Sri Lanka, Bangladesh, Nepal, Bhutan, Maldives and Afghanistan take part in this games.

See also

 Pakistan at the Olympics
 Pakistan at the Commonwealth Games

Notes and references
Notes

 The National Olympic Committees are all members of the Association of National Olympic Committees (ANOC), which is also split among five continental associations: Association of National Olympic Committees of Africa, Pan American Sports Organization, Olympic Council of Asia, European Olympic Committees, and Oceania National Olympic Committees.

References

 
History of sport in Pakistan